Uyuk-Tarlak II is an inscription erected by Yenisei Kyrgyz. It was found by Aspelin in 1888 on a slope two kilometres away from the river Tarlak, Tuva. The stone was transported to the Minusinsk Museum of Regional History in 1916 and catalogued under the number 20. It measures 183 x 33 centimetres.

Translation

Complete text

Transliteration
sIz : elmA : KWnǰWymA : WGLNmA : ḄWḌNmA : sIz : mA : LṬmŝ : Yŝm : DA
Ṭm : elṬWGN : ṬWṬwK : bn : tŋrI : elm : kA : elčIsI : rtm : LṬI : BGBWḌN : KA : bgI : rtm

References

Further reading 
 Aspelin, Johann Reinhold & Donner, Otto, 1889: "Inscriptions de l'Iénissei, recueillies et publiées par la Société Finlandaise d'Archéologie"
 Erhan Aydin, 2009: "DATA REGARDING YENISEY INSCRIPTIONS IN S. GERARD CLAUSON'S ETYMOLOGICAL DICTIONARY"

Archaeological sites in Russia
Turkic inscriptions